Tropaeolum hookerianum is a species of perennial plant in the Tropaeolaceae family. It is found in Chile.

References

External links 
 
 

hookerianum